The Baldwin Mono Tiltrotor project is a research effort into a tiltrotor aircraft that uses only one rotor. Like other tiltrotor configurations, the mono tiltrotor combines the vertical lift capability and structural efficiency of a helicopter with the speed and range of a fixed-wing aircraft.

Development

Work on the Mono Tiltrotor (MTR) was initiated in 2004. A concept study was performed under an Office of Naval Research contract and this study concluded that the MTR, if technically realizable, would be half the size and one-third the weight of legacy helicopter concepts for a  mission.

In 2005 and 2006, design of the 9400 pound gross weight MTR Scaled Demonstrator (MTR-SD) was performed under a United States Army contract at the US Army Research Laboratories.  This work included the following tasks: engine selection; transmission design; hub, controls, and blade preliminary design; comprehensive performance and aeroelastic analysis; analysis of critical stress concentrations; conceptual design of the fixed wing and cargo pod; wind tunnel testing of wing deployment; and longitudinal static stability analysis from hover through cruise. This work resulted in a definition of each component's and each subassembly's weight, moments of inertia, location on the aircraft, and aerodynamic drag. The predicted range and speed were derived from this aircraft design data.

In 2007 and 2008, demonstrations and validations of the MTR-SD design were performed under an Army contract.  The three unprecedented hardware mechanisms of the MTR were demonstrated in small scale flight tests: 1) the aerodynamically deployed wing panels; 2) the pitch axis suspended cargo pod; and 3) the tilting centerline rotor. Furthermore, a  diameter rotor remote control MTR Functional Demonstrator (MTR-FD) that integrates these three features was designed, built, and hover tested. Bell Helicopter Textron used proprietary methods for advanced concept design and analysis to validate the  rotor MTR-SD design. Bell Helicopter's assessment resulted in validations of the MTR-SD vertical lift capacity, engine power required and power available, cruise thrust and propulsive efficiency, aircraft weight, and airplane mode cruise lift. Bell Helicopter also generated and reported MTR-SD flight dynamics data. A computational fluid dynamics drag assessment was performed, and in combination with the Bell Helicopter assessment this validated MTR-SD projected drag and aircraft cruise range performance.

In early 2009, a Concept of Operations (CONOPS) video was produced showing the MTR-SD performing the missions specified in the United States Marine Corps - Cargo Unmanned Aircraft System - Universal Need Statement (USMC Cargo UAS UNS) and in the Office of Naval Research – Cargo Unmanned Aircraft System – Request for Information (ONR Cargo UAS RFI).  In early 2010, under a multi-year contract with the Office of Naval Research (ONR), the CONOPs and aircraft design were refined for Navy shipboard compatibility.

On October 2, 2010, the first full conversion between helicopter and airplane modes of flight was achieved using a revised Mono Tiltrotor - Functional Demonstrator (MTR-FD), 4 foot diameter, small-scale remote control model.

Specifications

See also

References

Further reading
 The Mono-Tiltrotor Final Project Report, U.S. Army Research Laboratory: Vehicle Technology Directorate, June 16, 2006.
 MTR FY 2005 Development Final Comprehensive Report, Eagle Aviation Technologies Incorporated, May 18, 2006.
 Leishman, J. G., Samsock, J., Mono Tiltrotor (MTR): Final Comprehensive Report of Research Performed During July 2005 – June 2006.
 Baldwin, G. D., 'Utility of a Mono Tiltrotor (MTR) Scaled Demonstrator', Proceedings of the 63rd Annual National Forum of the American Helicopter Society, Virginia Beach, VA, May 1-3, 2007.
 Baldwin, G. D., 'Preliminary Design Studies of a Mono Tiltrotor (MTR) with Demonstrations of Aerodynamic Wing Deployment', AHS International Specialists Meeting, Chandler, Arizona, January 23-25, 2007.
 Leishman, J. G., Ananthan, S., 'Aerodynamic Optimization of a Coaxial Proprotor', Proceedings of the 62nd Annual National Forum of the American Helicopter Society, Phoenix, Arizona, May 9–11, 2006.
 Samsock, J. J., Leishman, J. G., Baldwin, G. D., 'Mono Tiltrotor Parametric Research Model (MTR-PRM) Testing', Glenn L. Martin Wind Tunnel, February 13–24, 2006.
 Baldwin, G. D., 'Maturation of the Mono Tiltrotor (MTR) Aircraft Architecture, and Its Application to Heavy Lift and Other Emerging Needs', AHS Vertical Lift Design Conference, San Francisco, California, January 18-20, 2006.
 Baldwin, G. D., 'Mono Tiltrotor (MTR) Project', SAE International Powered Lift Conference, Grapevine, Texas, October 4, 2005.
 Preator, R., Leishman, J. G., Baldwin, G. D., 'Performance and Trade Studies of a Mono Tiltrotor Design', Proceedings of the 61st Annual National Forum of the American Helicopter Society, Grapevine, Texas, June 1-3, 2005.
 U.S. Patent 6,845,939 PDF Conversion — Baldwin, G. D., 'Tailboom-Stabilized VTOL Aircraft', January 25, 2005.
 U.S. Patent 6,783,096 PDF Conversion — Baldwin, G. D., 'Vertical Lift Flying Craft', August 31, 2004.
 Preator, R., Leishman, J. G., Baldwin, G. D., 'Conceptual Design Studies of a Mono Tiltrotor Architecture', Proceedings of the 60th Annual National Forum of the American Helicopter Society, Baltimore, Maryland, June 7-10, 2004.

External links
 Baldwin Technology Company, LLC website

Tiltrotor aircraft
Abandoned civil aircraft projects of the United States
Aircraft with contra-rotating propellers